Claude Rivière (born 24 December 1932) is a French anthropologist and professor of social anthropology at Sorbonne (Paris V).
He is known for his works on social anthropology.

References 

University of Poitiers alumni
Living people
French anthropologists
1932 births
Academic staff of the University of Paris